Atlas Network, formerly known as the Atlas Economic Research Foundation, is a non-governmental 501(c)(3) organization based in the United States that provides training, networking and grants for libertarian, free-market, and conservative groups around the world. It partners with about 500 organizations in nearly 100 countries.

History 

Atlas Network was founded in 1981 by Sir Antony Fisher, a British entrepreneur, who was influenced by economist F.A. Hayek and his book, The Road to Serfdom. After founding the Institute of Economic Affairs in London in 1955, Fisher had helped establish the Fraser Institute, the Manhattan Institute and the Pacific Research Institute in the 1970s. The late Linda Whetstone, Fisher's daughter, served as chairman of Atlas Network. 

Fisher conceived of Atlas Network as a means to connect various think tanks via a global network through which the organizations could learn best practices from one another and "pass the best research and policy ideas from one to the other." Atlas Network would receive funding from American and European businesses and think tanks to coordinate and organize neoliberal organizations in the developing world. The organization has been described as "self replicating, a think tank that creates think tanks."

According to its website, it is not named after Ayn Rand's novel Atlas Shrugged.

In 1981, Atlas Network helped economist Hernando de Soto found the Institute for Liberty and Democracy (ILD) in Peru and invested in the Institut Economique de Paris (IEP) in France. In 1983, Fisher helped launch the National Center for Policy Analysis (NCPA) in Dallas, Texas, and the Jon Thorlaksson Institute in Iceland. That organization was replaced by the Icelandic Research Centre for Innovation and Economic Growth. Atlas Network helped establish the Hong Kong Centre for Economic Research in 1987 and the Liberty Institute in New Delhi in 1996. Margaret Thatcher, F. A. Hayek, and Milton Friedman formally endorsed the organization. 

The 2019 and 2020 Global Go To Think Tank Index Report, published by the University of Pennsylvania, ranked the Atlas Network as 54th among the "Top Think Tanks in the United States."

Atlas Network has been criticized for its links to the tobacco industry. A 2017 paper in the International Journal of Health Planning and Management described the organization as a "strategic ally" of the industry, saying that it "channeled funding from tobacco corporations to think tank actors to produce publications supportive of industry positions." The University of Bath's Tobacco Control Research Group described the network as having a "longstanding funding relationship with the tobacco industry" and that it "appears to have played a particular role in helping the tobacco industry oppose tobacco control measures in Latin America." Le Monde identified 17 Atlas Network partners engaged in lobbying and advocacy for "tobacco harm reduction", which supports vaping as a substitute for smoking, with most of the partners receiving funds from the tobacco industry. 

Atlas Network is described as having close ties to oil and gas producers. It collaborated with the Macdonald-Laurier Institute in a push for oil and gas development on Indigenous land, according to documents described in The Guardian.

The Intercept and The Guardian have described the Atlas Network as having links to right-wing and conservative movements, including the administration of Donald Trump in the United States, Brexit in the United Kingdom, and anti-government protests in Latin America. According to The Guardian, "Atlas took no position on Brexit itself, and many of its European partners were opposed, but directors of UK groups in the network were prominent in the official campaign to take Britain out of the EU."

The Atlas Network was linked to an online campaign that used fake accounts against the Cuban government during the 2021 Cuban protests, according to disinformation expert Julián Macías Tovar. Tovar, cited in The Guardian, also said that Atlas Network members' Twitter accounts had been involved in bot or troll centre campaigns during the 2019 Bolivian political crisis, the 2021 Ecuadorian general election, and the 2021 Peruvian general election.

Leadership 
The chief executive officer of Atlas Network is Brad Lips. Lips joined Atlas Network, then known as Atlas Economic Research Foundation, in 1998 and became CEO in 2009. He is the author of Liberalism and the Free Society in 2021. He has said he advocates for a "freedom philosophy", and quoting Friedman to summarize Atlas Network's function as "to develop alternatives to existing policies, to keep them alive until the politically impossible becomes the politically inevitable".

Matt Warner is the organization's president, while Tom G. Palmer serves as executive vice president for international programs. Warner and Palmer co-authored the book Development with Dignity: Self-Determination, Localization, and the End of Poverty. Palmer, known in libertarian circles since the 1970s, has promoted libertarian efforts in various countries including communist and post-communist Eastern Europe, Iraq and Afghanistan; after the 2022 Russian invasion, he traveled inside Ukraine to help coordinate Atlas Network aid, which according to the Washington Examiner totaled $3.5 million by December 2022.

Atlas Network is organized into centers by region. Entrepreneur Magatte Wade is director of the Center for African Prosperity and the historian Ibrahim B. Anoba is a fellow at the center. Antonella Marty of Argentina serves as a fellow for the Center for Latin America, which publishes the annual Index of Bureaucracy. Atlas Network also runs the Center for United States and Canada and the Center for Asia and Oceania.

Activities

Training and networking 
The Atlas Network Academy teaches management and communication through credit-based courses. In 2020, Atlas Network trained nearly 4,000 people in promoting free-market voices, preparing nearly 900 people to work at global think tanks. Philadelphia Magazine described the Atlas Network as "supporting free-market approaches to eliminating poverty and noted for its refutation of climate change and defense of the tobacco industry".

Atlas Network holds four regional Liberty Forums (in Asia, Africa, Latin America, and Europe) and an international conference in the United States. At its December 2021 "Liberty Forum and Freedom Dinner" in Miami, Florida, for think tank partners from around the world, Mario Vargas Llosa and Yeonmi Park were among the 800 attendees, and Yotuel performed.  In Canada, Atlas Network partners with about a dozen think tanks.

Atlas Network has partnered with the F.A. Hayek Foundation in Slovakia, the Association for Liberal Thinking in Turkey, the Lithuanian Free Market Institute, and Libertad y Desarrollo in Chile to establish Free Enterprise Training Centers.

In 2021, Atlas Network partnered with Cuban anti-communism activist Ruhama Fernandez to share her story after Fernandez was arrested for criticizing the Cuban government. The Ukraine-based Bendukidze Free Market Center is also an Atlas Network partner.

Grants 
Atlas Network provides limited amounts of financial support to new think tanks on a case-by-case basis. Grants are usually given for specific projects and range between $2,000 and $5,000. In 2020, Atlas Network provided more than $5 million in the form of grants to support its network of around 500 partners worldwide.

The organization funds Costa Rica's IDEAS Labs, which helped reform the country's pension laws in 2020. Atlas also supports the Philippines-based Foundation for Economic Freedom, which works on property rights.

Awards 
Atlas Network’s Templeton Freedom Award, supported by Templeton Religion Trust and named after Sir John Templeton, was established in 2004. In 2015, the Acton Institute was awarded $100,000 for its documentary film “Poverty, Inc.” In 2020, the Center for Indonesian Policy Studies won the award for its Affordable Food for the Poor Initiative. In 2021, India's Centre for Civil Society was the winner. In 2022, the Sri Lanka-based Advocata Institute, an Atlas Network partner, won its Asia Liberty Award and the Templeton Freedom Award.

The organization's Think Tank Shark Tank competition allows professionals to pitch their projects to judges. In 2018, Dhananath Fernando won the Asia Think Tank Shark Tank championship for his research on the high cost of construction in Sri Lanka and his proposal to lower the taxes on construction materials. Students for Liberty Brasil won the 2021 Latin America competition for their project on educating Brazilian favela residents about property rights.

Financials 

As a non-governmental 501(c)(3) organization, Atlas Network receives donations from foundations, individuals, and corporations, but not government funding.

It has received major funding from Koch family foundations including the Charles Koch Foundation and the Charles Koch Institute, along with Koch-affiliated funds such as Donors Trust. Other donors include the Lynde and Harry Bradley Foundation, the John Templeton Foundation and the Lilly Endowment.

As of 2005, Atlas Network had received $440,000 from ExxonMobil, and has received at least $825,000 USD from the tobacco company Philip Morris. Of Atlas Network partners, 57% in the United States had received funding from the tobacco industry. Atlas Network said that corporate funding accounted for less than 2% of its total donations in 2020. National Review said that "fossil-fuel and tobacco interests" have provided less than 1% of Atlas’ funding over the last two decades.

As of 2020, Atlas Network had assets of $15,450,264.

Funding details as of 2020:

References

Further reading 
 Marie Laure Djelic: Building an architecture for political influence: Atlas and the transnational institutionalization of the neoliberal think tank. In: Christina Garsten, Adrienne Sörbom (eds.), Power, Policy and Profit. Corporate Engagement in Politics and Governance. Elgar, Cheltenham 2017,

External links 
 
 Atlas Network – Charity Navigator
 Organizational profile – National Center for Charitable Statistics (Urban Institute)
 

Political and economic think tanks in the United States
Non-profit organizations based in Washington, D.C.
Libertarian think tanks
Libertarian organizations based in the United States